Hannah Pearce (birth 17 November 1998) is a South African field hockey player for the South African national team.

Personal life
She attended St Mary's School, studied at the Harvard University.

National team
She successful debut in the South Africa v Namibia is Randburg. Shortly after this announcement, she was also named in the squad for the African Hockey Road to Tokyo Event.

Pearce participated at the  2022 Women's FIH Hockey World Cup, she was also named in the squad for the Commonwealth Games in Birmingham.

References

External links

Hannah Pearce to Harvard Crimson

2001 births
Living people
South African female field hockey players
Alumni of St Mary's School, Waverley
Field hockey players at the 2022 Commonwealth Games
Harvard Crimson athletes